Ramadhani "David" Opango (born 19 March 1978) is a Burundian former professional footballer who played as right-back.

Career
In 2008, Opango joined French lower league side Limoges FC.

Personal life
Like fellow countryman Shabani Nonda, he is a passport-holder of both Burundi and Democratic Republic of the Congo.

References

External links

Living people
1978 births
Association football fullbacks
Burundian footballers
Swiss Super League players
SC Bümpliz 78 players
FC Zürich players
FC Aarau players
FC Biel-Bienne players
Limoges FC players
Burundian expatriate footballers
Expatriate footballers in Switzerland
Burundian expatriate sportspeople in Switzerland
Expatriate footballers in France
Burundian expatriate sportspeople in France
Place of birth missing (living people)
Burundi international footballers